G protein-coupled receptor 6, also known as GPR6, is a protein which in humans is encoded by the GPR6 gene.

Function 

GPR6 is a member of the G protein-coupled receptor family of transmembrane receptors.  It has been reported that GPR6 is both constitutively active but in addition is further activated by sphingosine-1-phosphate.

GPR6 up-regulates cyclic AMP levels and promotes neurite outgrowth.

Ligand

Inverse Agonist 

 Cannabidiol

See also 
 Lysophospholipid receptor

References

Further reading

External links 
 

G protein-coupled receptors